Ugo Ferrante (18 July 1945 – 29 November 2004) was an Italian footballer and manager who played as a defender, in the role of sweeper or libero.

Club career
During his club career, Ferrante played for Pro Vercelli, Fiorentina (1963–72), and Vicenza (1972–76). He had a successful career with Fiorentina, winning the Torneo di Viareggio, the Mitropa Cup, and the Coppa Italia in 1966, as well as the 1968–69 Serie A title; he also reached two more Mitropa Cup finals in 1965 and 1972, as well as a Coppa della Alpi Final in 1970 during his time with the club, also playing in the European Cup Winners' Cup, the European Cup, and the Inter-Cities Fairs Cup.

International career
At international level, Ferrante earned 3 caps for the Italy national football team between 1970 and 1971. He was included in the Italian squad for the 1970 FIFA World Cup, although he did not make a single appearance as Italy went on to reach the final of the tournament, only to be defeated by Brazil.

Death
Ferrante died in 2004, at the age of 59, due to a throat tumor.

Honours

Club
Fiorentina
Torneo di Viareggio: 1966
Coppa Italia: 1965–66
Mitropa Cup: 1966
Serie A: 1968–69

International
Italy
FIFA World Cup (Runner-up): 1970

References

External links
Profile at Enciclopediadelcalcio.it

1945 births
2004 deaths
People from Vercelli
Italian footballers
Italy international footballers
1970 FIFA World Cup players
Serie A players
F.C. Pro Vercelli 1892 players
ACF Fiorentina players
L.R. Vicenza players
Association football defenders